FLOW THE BEST ~Single Collection~ is FLOW's first best album. Two different editions of the album were released: regular and limited. The limited edition includes a bonus DVD. It reached #4 on the Oricon charts and charted for 11 weeks. *

Track listing

Bonus DVD Track listing

References

Flow (band) albums
2006 compilation albums